"Burn" is the debut single by Spanish singer Ruth Lorenzo. The song is a cover originally sung by London-based singer Caiyo (aka Francis Rodino) from his 2009 album Circles and Squares. It was released on 27 June 2011 as a digital download in Spain. The song entered the Spanish Singles Chart at number 16.

Track listing

Chart performance
On 3 July 2011 the song entered the Spanish Singles Chart at number 16.

Weekly charts

Release history

References

External links
 Official website

2011 singles
2009 songs
Ruth Lorenzo songs